David Cherry (born 3 January 1991) is a Scotland international rugby union player who plays for Edinburgh Rugby in the United Rugby Championship.

Rugby Union career

Amateur career

Cherry played for Currie until 2014.

On leaving London Scottish he then played for French Federale 2 side Stade Niçois.

Professional career

Cherry signed his first professional contract with London Scottish in 2014. He was with the Exiles till 2017 when he joined Stade Niçois. Cherry joined Edinburgh in the summer of 2018.

International career

On 16 January 2019 Gregor Townsend named three hookers among seven uncapped players, for his Scotland Six Nations squad. Cherry was among those selected.

He was not selected in 2019 but was called up again in 2021. Cherry said: "I always thought I was good enough to play at this level, but it [the Scotland squad] was a big step up. But I’ve fitted in pretty well at Edinburgh and I’ve put in some good performances, so I don’t think I’m a million miles off."

He received his first cap for Scotland in the Calcutta Cup match against England at Twickenham Stadium on 6 February 2021. Scotland won the match 11-6. His first start came in the penultimate game of the Championship, a 52-10 victory over Italy in which Cherry scored two tries.  His fifth cap came in the postponed match against France on 26 March 2021 which Scotland famously won 27-23, when he scored his third international try

International tries 
As of 3 June 2022

References

External links
 
David Cherry - Edinburgh Rugby Profile

1991 births
Living people
People educated at Merchiston Castle School
Rugby union players from Edinburgh
Scottish rugby union players
London Scottish F.C. players
Edinburgh Rugby players
Scotland international rugby union players
Currie RFC players
Stade Niçois players
Rugby union hookers